Queen Hogu was the third wife of Mapum of Geumgwan Gaya. She bore the fourth ruler of the Gaya confederacy, Geojilmi of Geumgwan Gaya. She was the granddaughter of Cho Kuang, who was an attendant of Heo Hwang-ok for her marriage from India.

Family 
Grandfather: Cho Kuang
Grandmother: Moryang
Husband: Mapum of Geumgwan Gaya
Son: Geojilmi of Geumgwan Gaya

References 

Royal consorts of Gaya
Korean people of Indian descent
Gaya confederacy
Year of birth unknown
Year of death unknown